Maigret Goes Home (French: L'Affaire Saint-Fiacre) is a 1932 detective novel by the Belgian writer Georges Simenon featuring his character Jules Maigret. Maigret is called back to his home village to try to prevent a crime being committed. It was also released as Maigret on Home Ground and Maigret and the Countess.

Adaptations
Jean Gabin played the part of Maigret in a film adaptation in 1959 called Maigret et l'Affaire Saint-Fiacre. In 1962 it was made into an episode of the first Maigret television series starring Rupert Davies. In 1992 it was made into an episode of an ITV Maigret series.

References

1932 Belgian novels
Maigret novels
Novels set in France
Belgian novels adapted into films